Barney Barnato was a television mini-series based on the life of British diamond mining magnate Barney Barnato.  It was produced in South Africa, West Germany, and the United Kingdom.  It was first shown on television in South Africa by the South African Broadcasting Corporation on 9 April 1990.

Plot
A young and impoverished Barney Barnato emigrated from England to South Africa in 1870. There he first works at a circus and falls in love with and later marries Fanny. The ambitious Barnato uses his business acumen to establish himself within the rough business world of diamond mining and trading in Kimberley. Often crossing paths with the equally ambitious Cecil Rhodes. During this time he becomes one of the richest men in the British Empire.  He has to defend himself and his fortune from a number of competitors. When Barnato opposes Rhodes (now Prime Minister of the Cape Colony) in his efforts to start a war with the Boer Republics Barnato becomes the victim of a plot involving one of his nephews.  The series ends with Barnato being thrown overboard a cruise ship and his death being portrayed to the public as a suicide.

Cast 
 Sean Taylor as Barney Barnato
 Graham Hopkins as Cecil John Rhodes 
 Vinette Ebrahim as Fanny Bees
 Richard Cox as Harry Barnato
 Amadeus August as  Schneider
 Manfred Seipold as  Mr. Sonnenberg
 Claudia Demarmels as Mrs.  Schneider 
 Fiona Ramsay as Lily

References

External links

 

1990s South African television series
Television shows set in Johannesburg, South Africa
Television shows set in Africa
Television shows set in South Africa
Television shows set in Cape Town
Television series set in the 1870s
South African television miniseries
History of South Africa
Cultural depictions of Cecil Rhodes
1990 South African television series debuts
1990 South African television series endings